Carl Wooten Field is a stadium in Goodwell, Oklahoma on the campus of Oklahoma Panhandle State University. Carl Wooten Field is the home stadium for PSU's American football and track and field teams. It has also hosted local soccer matches.

The capacity of the stadium is 5,000, mostly seated in the main stand. The main stand is colored red, white, and blue and reads "OPSU" in white letters which cover the stand's central area from top to bottom.

External links
D2 Football - Carl Wooten Field

College football venues
Oklahoma Panhandle State Aggies track and field
Oklahoma Panhandle State Aggies football
Buildings and structures in Texas County, Oklahoma
American football venues in Oklahoma
Soccer venues in Oklahoma
Athletics (track and field) venues in Oklahoma
College track and field venues in the United States